The Shops at Mission Viejo (originally the Mission Viejo Mall) is a shopping mall located in Mission Viejo, California.  It is the southernmost mall in Orange County and is anchored by 2 Macy's locations, Nordstrom & Dick's Sporting Goods. The Shops at Mission Viejo is managed by Simon Malls, who owns 51% of it.

History
The mall opened in 1979 as the Mission Viejo Mall, anchored by Bullock's, May Company, J.W. Robinson's, and Montgomery Ward. The mall featured a three-screen Edwards movie theater, which was closed in 1998 and replaced that same year by the 10-screen Edwards Kaleidoscope across the street. Both Robinson's and May Company became Robinsons-May in 1993 while Bullock's became Macy's in 1996. In the year 1999, it underwent a $150 million renovation and expansion that brought many new retailers, including Nordstrom (replaced Montgomery Ward) and Saks Fifth Avenue. The original mall had been criticized since its opening for its poor interior lighting, a product of the 1970s energy crisis. The 1999 renovation greatly brightened the interior.

In 2000, Macy's remodeled and expanded the store while Robinsons-May consolidated the two stores as one, closing the former J.W. Robinson's store down (gutted out into a food court) and expanding the former May Company store. In 2006, the newly expanded Robinsons-May store became a second Macy's store, devoting it into a women's and home store. The other Macy's store formerly Bullock's became a men's, children's, and furniture store. Since remodeling/expanding, The Shops at Mission Viejo has featured a mix of upscale and mid-tier retailers, including the country's second Microsoft Store. It was during this renovation where the mall adopted its current name. In 2010, Saks Fifth Avenue closed, which later became Forever 21 (closed in 2019 due to bankruptcy). The space in 2021 was converted to Dick's Sporting Goods. In addition to renovating and expanding, Simon Malls signed 10-year leases with many stores to secure its investment.

References

Shopping malls established in 1979
Shopping malls in Orange County, California
Simon Property Group
Mission Viejo, California
1979 establishments in California